Saugeen–Maitland Hall is a co-ed students' residence at the University of Western Ontario in London, Ontario, Canada.  It is currently home to 1250 students and is the largest student residence on campus.

Saugeen–Maitland Hall is actually a combination of two residences which are built upon the same foundation and share the same entry floor. The building is divided at the upper elevator lobbies with Saugeen on the east side and Maitland on the west side. The residence has a cafeteria and snack bar, a large main floor lounge with a home theatre system and projection screen, an exercise room, four academic cafes, and music practice rooms. The residence is sub-divided into units, each consisting of three floors. Maitland has three units and Saugeen has nine. Most floors have 16 double rooms and four single rooms. The most recent renovation completed in 2016 included the dining hall at a cost of $3.4 Million.

The name
Saugeen is an Ojibwa word meaning "inlet." It is in reference to the Saugeen River in Bruce County which flows into Lake Huron and was once an important shipping barge route. Maitland is also the name of a river in Ontario flowing into Lake Huron near the town of Goderich. It was named for Sir Peregrine Maitland, a Lieutenant-Governor of Upper Canada.

The residence is most often known simply as "Saugeen", and until a few years ago, it was frequently called "The Zoo". While touring the residence while still under construction, Dr. T.B. Ong, the first residence proctor, commented that he "couldn't help thinking of the sectioned cages used for experimental animal specimens."  Given the atmosphere of the early days, the name evolved naturally, and "The Zoo" first appeared in print as early as 1971, in the first yearbook.

History

The beginning
Due to increased enrolment in the 1960s, UWO was facing a housing crunch.  To alleviate this, a new housing complex for single and married students was planned on the west side of Western Road near Medway Creek. Estimated to cost $12 million, the complex included the nearby apartment buildings of Bayfield, Beaver and Ausable Halls.  Together with Saugeen-Maitland, the complex was named the Glenmore Residences.

Delayed a year due to a construction strike, Saugeen–Maitland Hall opened in 1969 as the first co-ed residence on campus.  For the first two years, the living quarters of the men and women were separate; the men were in the Saugeen portion of the building and the women were in the Maitland portion, with locked doors between the two sections. Yet this was the closest proximity that men and women were allowed to live in the history of Western.

The new residence wasn't a big hit with the first residents.  The bare, white concrete walls and bolted-down furniture gave the residence an antiseptic, institutionalized feel.  The staff were told to expect an average of three suicides a year, based on an American survey of suicides in high rise buildings. The "animal" image was established by the Saugeen residents in the first year: much vandalism occurred, including broken elevators and phones torn off the walls.  By Christmas, many students had moved out in large numbers.  Many women didn't want to live in Maitland, as there were rumours of stabbings, rapes and police raids.  Several reasons were given for the problems: the large number (900 men, 300 women) of the residents, and the high ratio (80%) of first-year students.

Saugeen goes co-ed
In 1971, the university decided to merge the two separate residences into one, and allow men and women to live on alternating single-sex floors.  The number of women was increased to 500, correspondingly decreasing the men to 700.  More upper-year students were also brought in.

In 1975, the co-ed experiment continued further, with one unit of upper-year students given the opportunity to turn completely co-ed, with alternating rooms of men and women. Five years later in 1981, the trial was expanded to six units.  This setup was declared a success in reducing damages and other incidents, as it "helped make the males more conscientious and mature," according to Marty Benson, Residence Council President.  The co-ed trend continued until the male-female ratio was 50-50, and most floors in the building were mixed gender.

Fire: real and false
Early in the morning of January 12, 1984 the residents of Saugeen received their biggest scare in the history of the building. A male student was playing with toilet paper and matches in room 212 when he soon lost control. The contents of the room were totally incinerated, and the rest of the floor was severely damaged. Six students were sent to hospital, including the man responsible, who had burns on his feet.
  
A sophisticated fire alarm system was installed before the 1984-85 school year. The system proved to be overly sensitive, and over 50 false alarms happened throughout the year.

This was followed years later by another major incident. In January 1991 a massive fire broke out in underground electrical wiring, between Saugeen and the other Glenmore residences. Twelve fire trucks responded, and 2,000 residents were evacuated. The fire knocked out power in many buildings on campus, including the residences, which also disabled the backup power and even the fire alarms. Nobody was hurt in the incident.

This was followed by a rash of false alarms during the Christmas exam period in 1992. Five false alarms in one weekend caused students to wait out in the cold for more than two hours in the early morning, sending one resident to hospital with frostbite on her fingers and toes. The administration remedied this problem in 1994 by spending $850,000 on a new alarm system more resistant to malicious triggering.

Suppression of "The Zoo"
In an effort to fight the party animal image that had taken hold of Saugeen, and by extension Western, the administration began to crack down in 1989 on the use of the word "Zoo" being related in any way to the residence.  The yearbook, newsletter, and tuck shop were all renamed to more "appropriate" names. In response, upper-year and former residents took it upon themselves to keep the Zoo name alive by distributing flyers with the message "Zoo... pass it on" and "Zoo" graffiti appeared on campus.

Another method of rebellion took the form of an unsanctioned group called the Zoo Crew. When printed, the name was usually spelled with the Greek letters ΖΘΘ (zeta theta theta), in an effort to avoid the ban on "Zoo", which also gave the group a fraternity-like appearance.  The Zoo Crew was made up of former and current members of the residence, but was never officially associated with Saugeen. The group would organize pub crawls, and would sell a package including drink tickets, shot glasses and clothing with the words "Zoo Crew" on it. Even though a representative from the Zoo Crew argued Western's administration should not be upset about these pub crawls because they were not residents of Saugeen, this loosely run organization eventually dissolved as well.

During the 1998-1999 school year, the student council was asked to change the name of the Saugeen yearbook from The Jungle Book to something more appropriate, which did not refer even remotely to the Zoo. Western's administration feared the Zoo image would negatively impact enrolment and was the stated reason for the change. The students refused and released the yearbook with the same title. A heavy presence of photos deemed inappropriate resulted in the council being dissolved, many of the council members deemed responsible were denied re-admission to the residence the following year, and the residents' council was dissolved. The 1999 school year started without any residents' council to plan events or sit on the University Students' Council, and the number of Sophs were reduced to just 36 - one for each floor.

The Saugeen stripper
The University of Western Ontario has been selected among the Top 10 party schools in North America by Playboy magazine.

To some degree, Saugeen is responsible for UWO's reputation as a "party school", an image university officials have been trying to change for years. This has not been helped by events in October 2005, when an 18-year-old student performed a striptease in one of the dorm's rooms at a birthday party, with digital photographs of the party uploaded to the Internet. According to UWO sources, she was a willing participant and was aware that photographs were being taken. 

The incident briefly attracted widespread media attention and was the subject of articles by a number of Canadian media outlets, including the Toronto Star, The London Free Press, National Post and the local London A-Channel News. Eventually it was picked up by United States media outlets, including the Drudge Report. The television news magazine Inside Edition also pursued the story by interviewing students, but in several cases the students declined. However, the story and the associated photographs made headway on the Internet, with dozens of blogs and other Web sites.

The media attention sparked discussion about the role of the In loco parentis doctrine and whether institutions of higher learning have a responsibility to control what happens in their residences. In this case, all participants were willing and the activities were not explicitly forbidden in student housing rules and regulations.

Staff and volunteers
Dr. Cameron Henry, a professor of philosophy, was the first Warden of all men's residences on campus and Dr. T.B. Ong, a medical doctor from Indonesia, was the Proctor of Saugeen, with a female Proctor for the Maitland section of the building. Dr. Henry had an office at Saugeen, while Dr. Ong and the female Proctor both had offices and apartments in the residence complex.

One of the original administrative secretaries at Saugeen–Maitland Hall was the popular Darlene Wells who worked at the residence from 1969 to 1974 and then from 1976 until she retired on July 1, 1994. Darlene Wells died on April 26, 2011, at University Hospital in London.

Helping to keep order in the building were student "Dons" who oversaw a unit (three floors), along with three "House Seniors," all of which were provided rooms and received some nominal compensation for their efforts. All Dons and House Seniors reported to their respective Proctors. During the late 2010's, House Seniors are known as RAs or Residence Advisors. RAs can be found on the upper and lower floors, while Dons still occupy the middle floors. However, this policy has changed, and all Residence Advisors have since become Residence Dons due to conflicts between pay and the minimal differences between the two roles. 

Sophs are other upper-year students who live in the residence. While they do not carry any authority within the residence, they are important volunteers during Orientation Week and throughout the year. They are given nicknames for Orientation Week and the students on the floor generally refer to their soph by the soph name rather than the real name for the rest of the year.

The majority of residences at Western have used student staff on Weekends (Thursday, Friday and Saturday) to provide guest registration. This policy is put in place in order insure the safety of the residents.

Mascot
Saugeen Maitland Hall's official mascot is a stuffed chicken named Duke.
In the summer of 1986, the Residents' Council executive obtained a live chicken to stuff and serve as the official residence mascot for frosh week and beyond. In 2021, Duke was destroyed due to black mold that was left in the Soph room over Covid. Though in 2022 Duke was "revived" by aliens (the building theme) though it is not the same duke as before.

Media

Yearbook
First published in 1971, the yearbook first made its appearance simply named Saugeen-Maitland Yearbook.  As The Zoo nickname caught on, the publication was renamed The Zoo Revue.  During the 1990-1991 school year, the yearbook's title changed from The Jungle Book as a result of the crackdown on the Zoo name. Today the yearbook is once again called The Saugeen-Maitland Hall Yearbook.

Newspaper
The Saugeen Rumour is an in-residence newspaper which is published on a bi-monthly basis. It features the lives of Saugeen residents and their experiences at UWO. The Rumour covers all aspects of student living and attempts to keep the residents connected to the outside world by informing them of worldly events and news, as well as campus and London events.

Like the yearbook, the newspaper has undergone many name changes.  When started in 1982, it was originally called Zoo-ology, then Animal Trax and later shortened to Trax when Western officials began cracking down on the use of the word "Zoo" to describe Saugeen.

Anthem

Saugeen–Maitland Hall has had many songs written about it, but the most prominent is the song "Saugeen One Time" written and performed by Brad Harries. The song was written in 2005 and recorded in the building. Harries died in 2006 in a car crash, cementing the song as a bittersweet ode to Western's residence experience.

Notable residents
Duncan Coutts, musician for Our Lady Peace
Scott Russell, CBC Commentator, ''Hockey Night in Canada
Mike Turner, musician for Our Lady Peace

References and notes

External links
University of Western Ontario homepage
Saugeen Maitland Hall Home Page
University Students' Council
Saugeen-Maitland Hall, UWO Housing
Obituary of Darlene Wells, Saugeen's long time administrative secretary

University of Western Ontario
University residences in Canada
Buildings and structures in London, Ontario